Michael Diethelm (born 24 January 1985) is a footballer from Switzerland. He currently plays as a defender for SC Cham in the Swiss 1. Liga.

He previously played  for FC Luzern in the Swiss Super League and for FC Wohlen.

Diethelm is a former youth international and was in the Swiss U-17 squad that won the 2002 U-17 European Championships.

Honours 
 UEFA U-17 European Champion: 2002

External links
football.ch profile
 Michael Diethelm Interview

References

1985 births
Living people
Swiss men's footballers
FC Luzern players
FC Wohlen players
Swiss Super League players
Association football defenders